Burley is a civil parish in the metropolitan borough of the City of Bradford, West Yorkshire, England.  It contains 55 listed buildings that are recorded in the National Heritage List for England.  Of these, one is listed at Grade I, the highest of the three grades, there are none at Grade II*, the middle grade, and the others are at Grade II, the lowest grade.  The parish contains the village of Burley in Wharfedale, the smaller settlement of Burley Woodhead, and the surrounding countryside.  Most of the listed buildings are houses cottages and associated structures, farmhouses and farm buildings.  The other listed buildings include churches and a former chapel, a former school, a former corn mill and associated structures, and a hotel.


Key

Buildings

References

Citations

Sources

 

Lists of listed buildings in West Yorkshire